Miss Universe Thailand 2016, the 17th Miss Universe Thailand pageant was held at Royal Paragon Hall, Siam Paragon in Bangkok on July 23, 2016. 40 entrants from countrywide camped in Ayuthaya before flying back to Bangkok for the final stage.

The final night was broadcast live on Channel 3. The winner will be sent to Miss Universe 2016. Miss Universe Thailand 2015, crowned Chalita Suansane (a representative from Samut Prakan) at the end of the event. Chalita will represent Thailand at the Miss Universe 2016 competition and Atcharee will participate in Miss Earth 2016. Both of competitions was held in Philippines and at the same location.

Results
Color keys

§: Kusuma directly entered into Top 16 after winning Miss People's Choice.

Special awards

Regional auditions
On June 11, 2559 at the Event Hall, G Floor's advice Lifestyle Shopping Center in Chiang Mai.
On June 17, 2559 at Pullman Raja Orchid, Khon Kaen.
On June 19, 2559 at Phuket Square A1-A2 Jungceylon, Phuket.
March 24 - June 25, 2559 at Livingston Gallery, 3rd Floor, Siam Paragon, Bangkok.

Delegates
40 delegates have been confirmed. The information from Miss Universe Thailand Official website

Notes
 #37 Natpaphat Hongsachum also competed in Miss Universe Thailand 2015.

References

External links
 Miss Universe Thailand Official website

2016
2016 in Bangkok
2016 beauty pageants
Beauty pageants in Thailand
July 2016 events in Thailand